Jessica Emilia Marie Rosencrantz, née Andersson, (born6 October 1987) is a Swedish politician for the Moderate Party, and a minister of the Riksdag since 2010. She is the Moderates traffic-politics spokesperson. In October 2010, Rosencrantz started her work in the Riksdag as replacement-minister. And after two weeks, she became a full member of the Riksdag. This was after Minister Anna König Jerlmyr became vice mayor in Stockholm, by which time she left her place in the Riksdag. She became a suppliant for the finance committee and civilian committee.

Since 2013, she has been a suppliant in the European Commission as well.

She has been district president for the Moderate Party Youths in Stockholm. Rosencrantz has worked for the European parliament.

References

External links 

1987 births
21st-century Swedish women politicians
Living people
Members of the Riksdag 2010–2014
Members of the Riksdag 2014–2018
Members of the Riksdag 2018–2022
Members of the Riksdag 2022–2026
Members of the Riksdag from the Moderate Party
Place of birth missing (living people)
Women members of the Riksdag